The class MR and class MRD are classes of diesel multiple units (DMUs) built for the Danish State Railways (DSB). Delivered between 1978 and 1985, they have seen use primarily in regional passenger service. A total of 97 trainsets were built, initially by Waggonfabrik Uerdingen and later Scandia.

The class MR is an adaptation of the German class 628.0 and was first delivered in 1978. The trains were initially coupled as MR–MR carriages back-to-back. Starting in 1981, the class MRD was introduced to better accommodate passengers' luggage, and from then on the MR–MRD formation has been used. The trainsets can run in multiple, with up to five carriage pairs in a train having been used.

In 2003, Arriva took over operation of several branch lines in Jutland from DSB, and for this purpose rented 39 MR–MRD trainsets from DSB. 24 of these trains were returned to DSB in 2004–2005, and the remaining 15 in 2010. In addition, 13 MR–MRD trainsets were sold to Arriva in Poland in 2007–08. As of 2016, many of the MR/MRDs have been retired, while two trainsets are preserved by the Danish Railway Museum.

Notes

Bibliography

External links 

 DSB Regionaltog - Litra MR-MRD at jernbanen.dk 

MR
Train-related introductions in 1978